Bratsi is a district of the Talamanca canton, in the Limón province of Costa Rica.

Bribri is the head city of the Talamanca canton and is located in this district.

History 
Bratsi was created on 19 February 1970 by Decreto Ejecutivo 13.

Geography 
Bratsi has an area of  km² and an elevation of  metres.

Locations
Barrios Fields, Sand Box.
Poblados: Altamira, Akberie (Piedra Grande), Bambú, Chase, Cuabre, Gavilán Canta, Mleyuk 1, Mleyuk 2, Monte Sión, Olivia, Hu-Berie (Rancho Grande), Shiroles, Sibujú, Suretka, Uatsi.

Demographics 

For the 2011 census, Bratsi had a population of  inhabitants.

Transportation

Road transportation 
The district is covered by the following road routes:
 National Route 36
 National Route 801

References 

Districts of Limón Province
Populated places in Limón Province